The Brown Hotel in Neodesha, Kansas, at 523 Main St., was built in 1886.  It was listed on the National Register of Historic Places in 1995.  The listing was expanded in 2008.

Its main facades faces north onto Main St. and west onto 6th Ave.; the main entrance is on an angle at the corner itself.  This 1896 building is a two-story one, built to replace an earlier frame building which was destroyed in a fire, and it has a veranda added around 1904.  The 1995 National Register listing also included a two-story 1922 brick addition extending the building to the south.  After further research was completed, the listing was expanded in 2008 to include a two-story brick commercial building adjacent on the east, which was built around 1904 and was connected to the original hotel.

References

Hotel buildings on the National Register of Historic Places in Kansas
Italianate architecture in Kansas
Early Commercial architecture in the United States
Hotel buildings completed in 1896
Wilson County, Kansas
Hotel buildings completed in 1886